DJMax Portable Clazziquai Edition (DJMAX Portable Clazziquai Edition, DMP:CE; Korean: 디제이맥스 포터블 클래지콰이 에디션) is a music video game published and developed by Pentavision in South Korea for the PlayStation Portable released on October 24, 2008. This is the third title for the PlayStation Portable from in the DJMax Portable series after  DJMax Portable 2. The game features songs from the Korean band Clazziquai.

Features
This version includes new songs from DJMax Technika, 015B, BJJ, and from Clazziquai's 2008 mini album Metrotronics. Two additional modes have been revealed for the game called 2B and 4BFX.
Club Tour is a mode where the player can play in different clubs. Each club features one of three gameplay types. Music type clubs give the player a list of songs to play and the player must complete each song. Repertory type clubs have several sets of songs given to the player, and the player must complete each song in the set in order to complete the set. Mission type clubs contains challenges with various other DJ's with specific goals (example: clear a song with a certain number of points). If the player wins, their rank goes up, and if they lose their rank goes down. Players can earn new titles once their rank reaches a certain threshold. Players cannot challenge a DJ if the DJ's rank is too high compared to theirs.
Arcade mode features playing through one of six button modes in three stages. In general, the songs get harder the more buttons you use and the higher the stage number.
Album combines M/V and O.S.T. modes from past games. You can switch modes by pressing the Square button to view either the M/V or O.S.T. 
Collection is a mode where the player can view records of the songs you have played, play count, images (which players can save on to the PSP memory stick and use as PSP wallpapers), movies, emblems and internet ranking for Platinum Crew members only.
Multi-Player using Ad hoc PSP connections is also available.
Link Disc is a mode that connect to DJMax Portable, DJMax Portable 2, and DJMax Portable Black Square. Link Disc with DJMax Portable unlocks an additional Gear, three avatars, and a new song. Link Disc with DJMax Portable 2 unlocks another additional Gear, two avatars and a new song. Link Disc with Black Square unlocks three new songs.
Game Modes
2B – uses ◄ and ▲ as one button, and Triangle and Circle as one button; the middle is for the analog spinning notes.
4B – uses ◄, ▲, Triangle, and Circle buttons.
5B – uses ◄, ▲, Square and ► as one button, Triangle and Circle buttons
4BFX – a variation of 6B, uses ◄, ▲, Triangle, Circle, buttons along with the L and R shoulder buttons.
6B – uses ◄, ▲, ►, Square, Triangle, and Circle buttons.
Freestyle – Play songs without the stage and combo limit in any button modes. You have to unlock each song first in order to play it in this mode.
Full Motion Videos – The videos in the background are more detailed than in past games.
Sound Equalizer While Playing – DJMax uses PlayStation's built-in equalizer enhancements. It can be set to Off, Unique, Heavy, Pops, and Jazz.
Simplified Analog Use – The player can use just one direction for the analog stick as opposed to having to move it in a circle.
Media Install Ready – Part of the game can be installed on the PSP Memory Stick to decrease loading times.
Effector Changes – New Effectors:
Fever – Sets the maximum Fever multiplier. Fever can either be Automatically or  Manually activated. Note that the automated Fever gauge fills up slower than that of the manual option.
HP UP – Increases maximum HP.
Auto – Counts a certain number of missed notes as a Max 1% hit or allows for easy long notes (by holding after the note ends, get 100%)
Track – Adds note effects such as Blinking.

Platinum Crew Patch
Players who were members of Platinum Crew (a premium service dealing with DJMax) were given a game patch for Clazziquai Edition that can be turned on or off, once in effect the patch gives these changes:
Club Tour Season 2: This changes certain clubs, as in it changes its gameplay type, objectives and difficulty.
New Song Patterns: Harder versions of songs can be played, but it won't be show as an alternative pattern and will appear as a certain pattern in disguise (EX: Dark Envy 4B MX Style will play when the player selects Dark Envy 4B Normal Style as long as the patch is on).
Eight hidden songs: Eight of the game's songs could have their O.S.T. and music videos unlocked without the patch, but due to a glitch, the songs themselves can't be unlocked to play in Arcade mode. With the patch, the player had to play the song once in a Club Tour Music-type Club, then the song was unlocked to be played in any button mode and Freestyle. The eight songs are:
"To you [80's POP]" – Sweetune
"Tell me [Couple R&B]" – Lee Geol
"Proposed, Flower, Wolf [Piano Ballad]" – ReX**
"DJMAX [MAX HOUSE]" – Humming Urban Stereo
"Every Morning [80's 8bit]" – ND Lee
"Memory of Beach [Dance Pop]" – M2U
"Sunny Side [Bright RnB]" – Croove
"Ask to wind [R&B Fantasy]" – Forte Escape

** This song is also unlocked by Link Disc to DJMax Portable Black Square.

See also
 DJMax Portable 2
 DJMax Portable Black Square
 DJMax Technika

External links
 Official Website (Korean) 

Video games developed in South Korea
2008 video games
Portable Clazziquai Edition
PlayStation Portable games
PlayStation Portable-only games
South Korea-exclusive video games
Music video games
Turntable video games